All That You Fear is the eighth full-length release by Finnish black metal band Impaled Nazarene. The release was recorded at Anssi Kippo’s Astia Studios in July 2003. The sixth song of the album, “Suffer In Silence”, is dedicated to the band’s late guitarist, Teemu “Somnium” Raimoranta who died from falling from a railroad bridge a year prior to the album’s release. A music video was created for “Armageddon Death Squad.”

Track listing

Credits and personnel
Mika Luttinen – vocals (known as “Sluti666” in the liner notes)
Tuomio – lead guitar
Onraj 9 mm – rhythm guitar
Arc v 666 – bass
Repe Misanthrope – drums

Production
Produced By Impaled Nazarene & Anssi Kippo
Mixed By Mika Karmila
Engineered By Anssi Kippo & Teemu Auvinen
Mastered By Mika Jussila

References

2003 albums
Impaled Nazarene albums
Osmose Productions albums